Canoeing was contested at the 1987 Summer Universiade in Zagreb, Yugoslavia. Canoe sprint was the only discipline of canoeing contested.

Medal summary

Medal table

Men's events

Women's events

External links
 Results on HickokSports.com
 Results on sports123.com

1987 in canoeing
1987 Summer Universiade
1987